Home and Away is an Australian television soap opera. It was first broadcast on the Seven Network on 17 January 1988. The following is a list of characters that first appeared in 2011, by order of first appearance. All characters were introduced by the shows series producer Cameron Welsh. The 24th season of Home and Away began airing on 24 January 2011. The following month, the Braxton brothers; Darryl, Heath and Casey were introduced.  Miranda Jacobs and Kieran Monroe made their debuts in April. Marty Jones made his debut in June and Tegan Callahan arrived the following month. Fletcher Humphrys joined the cast in July as Gang Member Jake Pirovic. August saw the introductions of Harvey Ryan, Hammer, Stu Henderson and Sasha Bezmel. Shane Emmett made his debut as Mark Gilmour in September and lawyer Hayley O'Connor began appearing from October.

Darryl Braxton

Darryl "Brax" Braxton, played by Steve Peacocke, made his first screen appearance on 16 February 2011. The character and casting was announced on 9 January 2011. Peacocke heard about the role from his agent and he called the audition process "a lot of fun". Brax is the oldest of three brothers known as The River Boys, a "bad-boy surf gang with dodgy reputations." A writer for Channel Seven's Home and Away website stated that Brax has a "dodgy reputation and a chip on his shoulder." He is a surfing legend and commands a respect from his fellow surfies, which he finds useful. Peacocke commented that Brax just wants to escape his upbringing and have a successful family life. Brax tries to keep his younger brothers Heath (Dan Ewing) and Casey (Lincoln Younes) out of trouble. Shortly after his arrival, Darryl began a relationship with Charlie Buckton (Esther Anderson). For his portrayal of Darryl, Peacocke won the Logie Award for Most Popular New Male Talent in 2012.

Heath Braxton

Heath Braxton, played by Daniel Ewing, made his first on-screen appearance on 16 February 2011, originally departed on 29 July 2014 and made a one-off appearance on 23 September 2014. Heath is the second oldest of the Braxton brothers and was initially described as being "feared by cops and the residents of his home town of Mangrove River" and having a short fuse. Heath was the first of The River Boys to be announced, with Ewing's casting revealed on 24 September 2010. Heath is Ewing's second role with Home and Away, having appeared as Reuben Humphries in 2007. For his role, Ewing had to get fit and he joked "I don't think they would cast overweight guys to play surfers, so yeah, I'm sure it was a factor for the producers." He added that he cannot surf well and was relieved that the producers did not test his surfing skills at his audition.

Casey Braxton

Casey Braxton, played by Lincoln Younes, made his first on-screen appearance on 17 February 2011 and departed on 16 September 2014. Casey is the youngest of the Braxton brothers. The Daily Telegraph said that Casey is trying to break out of the River Boys mould and that he was kicked out of his last high school. Younes was planning to go to London to travel and to find himself, but after a successful audition for Home and Away, he decided to cancel his plans to play the part of Casey. He relocated to Sydney for the role. Casey is described as being a "modern day Rebel Without a Cause." He has never quite fitted in and he does not know what he wants from life. He has been overshadowed by both of his brothers and he has struggled at school. Casey later begins a relationship with Ruby Buckton (Rebecca Breeds), following her fling with Romeo Smith (Luke Mitchell).

Miranda Jacobs

Miranda Jacobs, played by Ashley Cheadle, made her first on-screen appearance on 6 April 2011. Miranda comes to Summer Bay to compete in the Surf Carnival and she begins dating Xavier Austin.

It was revealed in January 2011 that Cheadle had joined the cast of Home and Away as a love interest for one of the characters. Cheadle is a professional surfer and Tania Seager of Yahoo!7 said she is "not the standard beach blond surfer that typifies our Summer Bay culture." Cheadle's character, Miranda, competes against Ruby Buckton (Rebecca Breeds) in the Surf Carnival and Cheadle revealed that she and Breeds did their own stunts, which she said was "fun." Seager said "Miranda also sorts out the boys from the men and gives Xavier a lot to think about." Miranda briefly dates Xavier Austin (David Jones-Roberts) and she is "annoyed" when she discovers that he lied to her about being in university. Miranda gives him a second chance, but Xavier manages to "mess things up" again. Holy Soap said that it had not been confirmed how long Miranda would be in the show.

Xavier Austin delivers pizza to Miranda's house and she flirts with him. Xavier later attends a party at Miranda's home and she assumes he is a university student. They arrange to meet her again and go to a party hosted by Ruby Buckton and Casey Braxton (Lincoln Younes). When April Scott (Rhiannon Fish) is thrown into the swimming pool, Miranda and Xavier help her out and take her home. Miranda invites Xavier to an exhibition at an art gallery and they late fall asleep on the beach. Miranda tells Xavier that she will help train him for the Surf Carnival. Gina Austin (Sonia Todd) invites Miranda to give a talk at Summer Bay High and Miranda discovers Xavier is a school student. Xavier begs Miranda for a second chance, which she agrees to. She helps him out with a pizza delivery, but when she hears him lying to Angelo Rosetta (Luke Jacobz) she tells him that he needs to grow up and leaves. On the day of the Surf Carnival, Ruby Buckton goads Miranda and during the race, Ruby deliberately tries to cut Miranda off. Miranda knocks Ruby into the water and wins the race. Ruby has a go at Miranda for cheating and Xavier stands up for her.

Kieran Monroe

Kieran Monroe, played by Andrew Hazzard, made his first on-screen appearance on 6 April 2011. Kieran was introduced as a love interest for Indigo Walker, but his attempts to win her over make him seem "creepy".

Hazzard said joining Home and Away was "fun" and that the cast and crew had been very welcoming. Hazzard described Kieran as being a "quite a straightforward, achievement-orientated guy... in his own mind anyway." Hazzard told Holy Soap that he saw his character as wanting to succeed at his university course and his relationship with Indigo (Samara Weaving). Kieran wants to own a farm and become a great husband and father. Hazzard also felt that Kieran has been "messed around" by people. Kieran meets Indigo at a party and he falls in love with her instantly. Even though she lies to him and he does not know what is happening with their relationship, Kieran cannot stop his feelings of love for her. Kieran meets Indigo's family and Hazzard said that he "tries to be as amiable as he possibly can be. I think he feels if he makes a great impression on Indi's family, then he will have more of a chance with Indi."

Kieran also meets Indigo's ex-boyfriend, Romeo Smith (Luke Mitchell) at the party. Hazzard said that his character "definitely knows something has happened" between Indigo and Romeo and Kieran wants Romeo out of his way. When asked if Kieran is dangerous, Hazzard opined that he thinks his character has a "dangerous streak", but he did not think Kieran would hurt Indigo. The actor explained that Kieran want to be the best he can possibly be and his emotions get the better of him. On playing a bad guy, Hazzard told the website, "I didn't actually see Kieran as a 'bad guy'. Even in his final scene, where he is manhandling Indi out of the bushes and attempting to put her in his car, I feel that he was doing all of that with the best intentions. He says, 'What would your dad say if I left you out here?', and I feel that really was his motivation for wanting to get her back in his car. He really did just want to get her home safely." The actor added that Kieran could appear to come across as a bad guy from the viewer's point of view, but not from his character's. He said "He's lovesick, I think. And as we all know, sometimes love makes us do some crazy things."

Kieran meets Indigo Walker at a party and he later sends her a flirty text. Kieran asks her out and Indigo says that she will get back to him. Romeo Smith then warns Kieran to back off. Indigo accepts Kieran's invitation for a date, but when he wants to meet up again, Indigo tells him that she is busy. Kieran shows up and Indigo's house and he helps Indigo and her brother, Dexter (Charles Cottier), put together some furniture. Indigo tells Kieran that she just got out of a relationship and she is not interested in him. Kieran appears to accept this, but when Indigo goes to a club to see a band, he turns up too. Kieran offers to drive Indigo and Nicole Franklin (Tessa James) and they accept. Kieran drops Nicole off, but tries to take Indigo somewhere else. She panics and asks him to let her out of the car. Kieran does and he drives off. He later comes back to find Indigo, which scares her. He grabs her and is trying to get her into his car, when Romeo arrives. Romeo goes to fight Kieran, but Indigo tells him not to.

Erin Miller of TV Week called Kieran "freaky" and a stalker. She also said that he "kept hanging around Indi like a bad smell." Miller later said Kieran was "a rather intense suitor" and "crazed."

Marty Jones

Marty Jones, played by Matty Lui, made his first appearance on 27 June 2011. Lui won the role of Marty after an audition in Hawaii. Lui told Yahoo!7, "My agent called me up and said that they are casting a really cool role on the most famous show in Australia and if I was up to auditioning for it, I jumped at the chance and it was awesome working with a super great cast and crew in Hawaii." Lui is a Hawaiian five time surf champion, which the writers incorporated into his character's storyline. While Lui was on the set he taught Samara Weaving to surf.

Roo Stewart (Georgie Parker), Romeo Smith (Luke Mitchell) and Indi Walker (Weaving) travel to Hawaii to attend a tourism exhibition. Marty is Roo and Romeo's business acquaintance and Indigo helps win him over. Marty later makes Indi a job offer, but Indi turns it down. Marty is happy for her and Romeo when they get married during their stay. Roo tries to distract herself from talking to Sid Walker (Robert Mammone) by spending time with Marty. When she introduces Sid to Marty, he makes Roo realise that she is actually attracted to Sid, and he encourages her to pursue a relationship with him.

Tegan Callahan

Tegan Mary  Callahan, played by Saskia Burmeister, made her first on-screen appearance on 4 July 2011. Tegan is a River Girl and Darryl Braxton's (Steve Peacocke) ex-girlfriend. She comes to Summer Bay to try and win him back. The character and casting was announced on 24 April 2011. Burmeister told The Daily Telegraph that she had an extended guest role and the door would be left open for a future return. Burmeister said she would love to come back. The actress revealed she and her husband were finalising a European holiday, just as the offer to appear in Home and Away came through. She also revealed that she bleached her usual brown hair blonde for the role. Burmeister's younger sister, Martika Sullivan, who played Kelly O'Mara also landed a role in the show at the same time. 

Burmeister described Tegan as a bitch and a "naughty character", which she said attracted her to the role. Burmeister is often cast as the girl next door and she relished the chance to play Tegan. She said "I love her. I find myself gasping at what she is doing." The actress added "She's really nasty, dark and menacing and likes to cause trouble." Lizzy Lovette of The Sun-Herald said Tegan is a "manipulative surfer chick", who arrives in the Bay to ruffle some feathers. Peacocke revealed that Tegan comes to town to do his mother's bidding. He told TV Week, "Brax has been butting heads with his mum, Cheryl (Suzi Dougherty), so she decides to contact Tegan to suss out what's going on with [him]." Peacocke explained that Darryl has a soft spot for Tegan because they share a history, but he does not trust her and she is not the type of person he can confide in. Tegan is shocked to learn that Darryl is in a relationship with Charlie Buckton (Esther Anderson). The Daily Star Sunday reported that Tegan will stop at nothing to split Darryl and Charlie up. Darryl wants nothing to do with Tegan and he orders her to leave town after she threatens Charlie. An insider told the paper: "She's devastated when he tells her to leave. But there really is nothing worse than a woman scorned." The Daily Record said Tegan was "certainly a firebrand."

Tegan comes to Angelo's to see Darryl Braxton, after talking to his mother, Cheryl. Tegan asks him about his new girlfriend, but Darryl refuses to give her any details, so she cannot report back to his mother. Tegan tells Heath Braxton (Daniel Ewing) that Darryl has changed and when he mentions that Darryl owns Angelo's, Tegan goes to see Colleen Smart (Lyn Collingwood). Colleen tells Tegan all about the River Boys and Darryl's arrival in Summer Bay. Tegan later spots Darryl with Charlie Buckton. She confronts Charlie, telling her that she knows about her relationship with Darryl and that their secret is not safe with her. Darryl later tells Tegan to leave. Tegan returns and reveals to Darryl that she is dating Jake Pirovic (Fletcher Humphrys). She tells him that Jake knows about Heath's plan to launch a raid on his land and tells Darryl to stop Heath before he gets killed. Tegan later turns up with bags of drugs and Heath helps her hide them. Tegan goes to see Darryl and she kisses him. They have sex and Charlie finds them together. Jake stabs Darryl and Tegan helps him with his injury. She later reveals to Charlie that Darryl is Darcy's father. Tegan tells Darryl and he initially asks for a DNA test, but changes his mind. Casey (Lincoln Younes) overhears Tegan and Cheryl talking and learns Tegan is lying to Darryl. Casey tells Darryl, who confronts Tegan and she reveals Heath is Darcy's real father. Tegan decides to go back to Jake. A storm hits the Bay and Heath takes Darcy to the high school. Tegan arrives and tells Heath he had no right taking Darcy and they leave. Tegan crashes her car and Charlie arrives to help her. Tegan panics when she realises Darcy is missing, but Darryl finds her. Tegan tells Charlie she loves Darryl, but he does not love her. Tegan is pulled out of the car and taken to hospital. She reveals to Darryl that she told Hammer (Benedict Samuel) about him and Charlie. Tegan goes into surgery, but she dies from her injuries.

Harvey Ryan

Harvey Ryan, played by Marcus Graham, made his first on screen appearance on 10 August 2011. The character and casting was announced on 31 July 2011. Graham was originally supposed to have a small guest role, but he asked the producers if he could stay and was contracted until the end of 2012. Of this, Graham told the Herald Sun, "I came in for a couple of episodes and it was just a really, really great experience ... I've worked with Georgie (Parker) before in theatre and we started in the business around the same time and get along very well so I thought, why not?"

Harvey Ryan is described as being the "expert on all things sailing and boating in Summer Bay." He was brought up in Summer Bay and runs a local fishing charter. Of Harvey, the official Home and Away website explained, "Harvey is a big fish in a small pond and more than capable of winning a woman over with his smile, his easy charm and his blokey boatie ways." However, Harvey is capable of making enemies and he gets on the wrong side of many locals, including Romeo Smith (Luke Mitchell), who becomes convinced Harvey trashed his boat to ruin his business. Romeo finds out Harvey has been stealing his clients and copying his ideas, and when his boat is vandalised, Romeo decides to report him to the police. The official website said "The gloves are off and both men settle in for a war." Romeo later apologises to Harvey, but Harvey is not interested and he complains to the council about Romeo and Alf Stewart (Ray Meagher) not having a permit for their mooring.

On 4 July 2013, it was revealed Graham had finished filming on Home and Away. Following his on-screen departure, Graham explained that it was agreed all round "that it was time to finish Harvey" and he called his exit "harmonious". Graham admitted to staying with the show longer than he originally planned, as he was enjoying the work. He added that he would not rule out a return to Home and Away in the future.

When Romeo Smith's boat is trashed, he believes Harvey is behind it. He also learns Harvey has stolen some of his clients and has obviously copied his business ideas. Romeo reports Harvey to the police, but Elijah Johnson (Jay Laga'aia) clears Harvey of the crime when he finds the real culprit. Romeo apologises, but Harvey informs him that he has just complained to the council about Romeo's lack of permit for his mooring. Romeo and his partner, Alf, are forced to move their boat, when the council tell them in legal terms, their mooring did not officially exist. Harvey tells Romeo that he is next in line to take over the mooring. However, when he checks it out, he finds it gone. Harvey later confronts Romeo with a story about Alf and the mooring in the paper. Roo Stewart (Georgie Parker) invites three investors to look at the new resort site. Due to an impending storm, Alf stops Romeo from using the Blaxland, but Harvey agrees to take them all out in his boat in the hope of winning the marina contract. The bad weather causes Harvey's boat to sink and Romeo and Alf are forced to save Roo, Harvey and the investors. Romeo finds Harvey, who is injured and manages to get him to the hospital. Harvey asks Alf if they could go into business together as he has the mooring and Alf has the boat. Alf persuades Romeo to agree to the deal. Harvey and Roo go on a date, but Roo leaves early. Harvey asks her out again and they go out to dinner. Romeo gets fed up of Harvey neglecting his jobs an confronts him. Harvey tells Romeo he will pull his weight, but he later tells Alf that Romeo skipped his chores.

Romeo believes Harvey is trying to get the marina contract behind his back when Harvey reveals he is thinking about getting his own boat. Roo begins avoiding Harvey and he thinks she is still in love with Sid Walker (Robert Mammone). However, Roo denies this and kisses Harvey. Harvey empties a can of petrol on the Blaxland and blames Romeo for it in front of Alf. Harvey later offers to buy the Blaxland from Alf. Roo confronts Harvey about using her to get the Blaxland and she breaks up with him. Harvey and Roo realise that they still have feelings for each other and get back together. Harvey runs for a position on the council against Alf and wins. He shuts down the proposed resort and John Palmer (Shane Withington) starts to suspect him of being corrupt. Roo and Harvey briefly break up again, but reconcile. Harvey's ex-wife Melissa (Allison Cratchley) arrives in the Bay with their daughter, Lottie (Morgan Weaving). Harvey contracts food poisoning and while he is in the hospital, Mel visits him and asks to stay at his house. When Harvey is reunited with Lottie, she gives him a cold reception due to his absence. Harvey then tells Roo about Mel and Lottie and she initially gives him the silent treatment as he did not tell her straight away. A week later Roo tells him that she wants to meet Lottie and they go on a picnic. John comes to Harvey and Roo with questions about a newly proposed Eco Park and warns them that he is going to the council. Harvey is later seen arguing with the mayor.

John tells the press that Harvey rigged the council elections and Harvey resigns from the council. He is also punched by a member of the public and Mel treats him. She admits that she is still struggling to deal with their young son, Ben's death. Harvey admits that he was aware of the Mayor's vote rigging scam and has to go to court. Roo convinces him to let her aunt, Morag (Cornelia Frances), represent him and when he pleads guilty, he is given community service and a fine. Harvey then realises he has to sell his house to pay the fine. Harvey and Lottie move into Summer Bay House with Roo, while Mel goes to a clinic in the city to help her deal with Ben's death. When Harvey returns from visiting her, he reveals that she wants Lottie to join her in the city. He breaks the new to Lottie and she decides that she wants to stay in the Bay. Mel does not take the news well and she and Harvey begin a custody battle. Mel threatens to reveal that Harvey was drunk when Ben fell off their boat and died, so Harvey tells Lottie and Roo himself. Lottie eventually decides that Mel needs her and they leave. Harvey proposes to Roo and she accepts. Roo's ex-boyfriend Tim Graham (Jonny Pasvolsky) arrives in Summer Bay intending to get Roo back. Tim and Roo share a kiss, causing Harvey to fight with Tim. When Harvey thinks that Roo has chosen Tim, he goes to the city to see Lottie and ends up having a one-night stand with Mel. Roo later finds out and the pair fight, but they eventually reconcile. Harvey and Roo begin planning their wedding and Roo invites Winston Markman (John Batchelor) to be Harvey's best man. They later marry and run the caravan park together. When teenage runaways Maddy Osborne (Kassandra Clementi) and Spencer Harrington (Andrew Morley) rent a caravan from Harvey and Roo, they become like parents to the two children and they eventually move into Summer Bay House with them.

When Winston returns to the Bay, Harvey makes plans with his best friend to go on a fishing trip with him away from the area. However, Roo receives news that Harvey and Winston's boat is missing, and, although Winston is found quickly, Harvey vanishes for several months. He returns abruptly without explanation of where he has been, but is obviously scarred by the experience. He finds Summer Bay claustrophobic and realising that things have changed between him and Roo, they decide to get a divorce so Harvey can leave. Spencer takes the news that Harvey is leaving badly but they reconcile before Harvey leaves.

Jake Pirovic

Jake Pirovic, played by Fletcher Humphrys, made his first screen appearance on 22 July 2011 and departed on 23 January 2012. In 2014, Humphrys reprised his role as Jake and returned to the serial. Humphrys' co-star Tai Hara, who plays Andy Barrett, spoke to TV Week about Andy's involvement with Jake: "He's on a one-way train that's going nowhere but off the tracks. It's relentless in terms of the number of stuff-ups he's making. Andy has lied to so many people. Everyone has turned their back on him. He's at his lowest point and thinks he can't possibly make any more bad decisions. Jake's older and Andy thinks he's a shady person. But Jake also gives Andy a sense of validation. It makes him feel better." It was revealed that Jake's return storyline would culminate in a murder.

Jake is the leader of a rival surf gang to the River Boys. He dates Tegan Callahan (Saskia Burmeister). Jake is arrested alongside Heath Braxton (Dan Ewing), when Heath attempts to raid the rival gang's drug crop but Pirovic is later released. He demands his drugs back from Heath's brother Darryl (Steve Peacocke) and kidnaps their younger brother Casey (Lincoln Younes) and Ruby Buckton (Rebecca Breeds). Brax returns the drugs to Jake in exchange for Casey and Ruby, but when he realises some are missing, he stabs Brax. Jake is later arrested and sent to jail. While inside prison, Jake's brother Hammer (Benedict Samuel) takes over the lead of his crew but is later shot dead by Charlie Buckton after a failed kidnap attempt. Upon his release, he goes to Charlie Buckton's (Esther Anderson) home and shoots her twice killing her in revenge for killing his brother. Jake waits for Brax at his house and the pair fight before Jake takes off in his car, closely followed by Brax. They fight again on the beach and Jake is caught by the police. He confesses to shooting Charlie and is re-sentenced.

Two years later, Jake is revealed to be the leader of a drug dealing gang that Andy Barrett owes money to. He has three members of his gang including his second, Cody Dalton (Aaron Glenane) to attack Casey and Denny Miller (Home and Away) (Jessica Grace Smith) and kidnap Josh and Evie MacGuire (Philippa Northeast). to make sure Andy pays up. Jake tells Andy about Charlie killing Hammer and blames Brax for his brother's death as well.  After Josh wants nothing to do with Andy following the kidnap ordeal, Jake uses it to his advantage and tries to convince Andy that he can stop Brax before his brother gets killed. Andy initially agrees to help Jake but then realises that Jake is planning to kill Brax. When Andy refuses to help Jake anymore with his plan to try to get Brax's attention, Jake kidnaps Josh as leverage. Andy and Casey meet up with Jake to try and rescue Josh and Casey hits Jake with a stick allowing Andy to run off. Brax and his brother Kyle (Nic Westaway) arrive to assist Casey, but Jake ends up shooting Casey from outside the barn whilst aiming for Brax. Casey then dies of his injuries.

Andy later calls Jake and tells him to leave Brax alone because he is already suffering due to Casey's death, but an unrepentant Jake tells him that he is not finished with Brax. Brax then goes looking for Jake to avenge Casey. Brax and Andy hide out at the murder scene where they believe Jake will return to inspect the sight. After spotting tyre tracks on the dirt road he quickly speeds off with Brax & Andy in pursuit. Brax and Jake attempt to run each other off the road when Jake quickly manages to lose the pair but is then cornered on a dead end road, Brax hurtles the car causing it to crash into Jake's vehicle knocking him off the road and seriously injuring him. Brax proceeds to confront the already injured Pirovic one last time but his car explodes. Jake is hospitalised and is put into a medically induced coma on life support. Senior Sergeant Mike Emerson (Cameron Stewart) reveals that Jake was transferred from prison to a low-security facility, as he was deemed not responsible for his actions when shooting Charlie two years ago, under a psychiatric order and had been held there for the past year and ended up escaping.

Brax tells doctor Nate Cooper (Kyle Pryor) to let Jake die but when he refuses Brax tries one last attempt to kill Pirovic by disconnecting his life support machine, but he is arrested by the police before he can do so. Andy then after hours sneaks into the hospital and disconnects Jake's life support machine, causing him to die as a result.

Hammer

Harman "Hammer" Pirovic, played by Benedict Samuel, made his first appearance on 22 August 2011. The character and casting was announced on 30 July 2011. Hammer is a member of a gang rivalling the River Boys. His real name is Harman and Samuel told the Herald Sun that he comes to uphold his honour and stir things up in Summer Bay. He added "I'm hired muscle, which is kind of ironic since I'm the skinniest person you've ever met. There's a lot of pursed lips and steely looks." The Advertiser described Hammer as a "big, hard guy with a lot of attitude" who plays second fiddle to his brother.

Hammer is a member of his brother Jake's (Fletcher Humphrys) gang. While Jake is in prison, Hammer becomes the leader of the gang. He gives Darryl "Brax" Braxton (Steve Peacocke) a warning and when he learns Heath Braxton (Daniel Ewing) turned witness on Jake for an early release from jail, he threatens the brothers. Hammer and his gang beat Heath up. Heath and some members of the River Boys, retaliate by smashing up Hammer's car. Hammer and his gang set fire to Heath's car and the gangs face off on the beach. They are broken up by the police, but Hammer's gang get a hold of Stu Henderson (Brenton Thwaites) and remove his tattoo. They dump him outside of Brax and Heath's house. Charlie Buckton (Esther Anderson) and her colleague Georgina Watson (Jacklyn Albergoni) stop Hammer for speeding and they find a large piece of wood. Georgina stays with him to search the rest of his ute, while Charlie goes to stop a brawl between the gangs. Hammer goes to the hospital when he learns Jake's girlfriend, Tegan Callahan (Saskia Burmeister) died. He warns Brax that the next time they meet, both he and Charlie will be dead. Hammer later tells Brax that Jake wants to see him suffer, so he and his gang are going to go after Charlie. Someone then shoots Charlie from Hammer's car. One of Charlie's colleagues reveals Hammer was at the station reporting his stolen car when she was shot. Charlie decides to bring in Hammer, but he reveals nothing about the shooting. Hammer attends Tegan's funeral and then confronts Brax, demanding he gives up his territory. Hammer kidnaps Charlie and tells Brax to come and save her. Hammer intends to kill them both, but a fight breaks out and Charlie shoots Hammer dead.

Stu Henderson

Stuart "Stu" Henderson, played by Brenton Thwaites, made his first appearance on 23 August 2011. Shortly after Thwaites relocated to Sydney from Cairns in April 2011, he was given the five-month recurring role of Stu on Home and Away. He called the show a great learning experience and said his co-stars were easy to work with. Tristan Swanwick of The Courier-Mail said Thwaites' character is part of a major storyline, which lasts for the rest of the year.

Stu is a new member of the Bay's River Boys. The Gold Coast Mail called him "another pot-stirring River Boy who comes in to 'rock The Bay'." Swanwick said Thwaites was too a "bit too pretty to be a bad-ass River Boy", but a few fake tattoos would fix that. Of his character, Thwaites told The Courier-Mail, "Stu's awesome, he has some fights, he gets the girls, it's awesome fun." Thwaites also told The Cairns Post that Stu would come in and steal the heart of a "beautiful young lady." The River Boys rival's are Hammer's (Benedict Samuel) gang. Hammer targets Stu as he is new and he gets his "Blood & Sand" tattoo sliced off his arm. Steve Peacocke (who plays Darryl Braxton) said "They chose the youngest and freshest face to send out a warning, and that's just fuel for the fire." The attack on Stu, prompts a brawl between the River Boys and Hammer's gang. In February 2012, it was announced Stu's lifeless body would be found in the caravan park by Alf Stewart (Ray Meagher). Robert Mammone who plays Sid Walker, told a columnist for All About Soap that the investigation into Stu's death is "very thorough and you never know what they may find". Mammone added that there would be a high amount of questioning and "several bay residents will becomes suspects".

Stu becomes a member of The River Boys and is excited to show off his new tattoo at school. Stu and Heath Braxton (Daniel Ewing) come across Hammer's (Benedict Samuel) car and trash it, which sparks a gang war. The two gangs face off on the beach, but are broken up by the police. Shortly after, Hammer's gang get a hold of Stu and remove his tattoo. They dump him outside of Darryl (Steve Peacocke) and Heath's house. Stu goes to the hospital and has surgery on his arm. Stu meets Sasha Bezmel (Demi Harman) and they spend the day together. Sid does not approve of Stu and warns him to stay away from his daughter. Sid later relents and allows Stu to date Sasha. Stu asks Sasha for a sexy picture and she sends him a topless photo of herself. Stu later tells Sasha he loves her. Stu confronts Sasha when she does not reply to his texts. She tells him she did not have any credit, but Stu becomes angry and thinking she may have moved on, he slaps her. Stu apologises and presents Sasha with a ring. Stu draws a picture for Sasha and she later reveals she got it tattooed on her stomach. Stu becomes angry at what she has done and slaps her across the face. Stu apologies and Sasha forgives him. Stu slaps Sasha again when he learns she received a text from another boy. Sasha screams at Stu to leave and later breaks up with him. Stu steals Xavier Austin's (David Jones-Roberts) car and insists Sasha gets in, she does and he begs her to give him another chance. Sasha agrees and accepts her ring back. Sasha ends up in hospital after her tattoo becomes infected. Sid assumes Stu talked Sasha into getting the tattoo and Sasha begins avoiding Stu and his calls. Stu asks Sasha to the Year 12 formal, but she turns him down. Stu spots Sasha at the formal and he starts harassing her. When she yells at him, he hits her. Sid witnesses this and proceeds to violently bash Stu, hospitalising him. Stu is later charged with assault. He meets with Sasha to discuss their fathers' behaviour. Stu's father, Alan (Peter Phelps), catches them together and drags Stu away. Stu later reveals to Sasha that Alan hit him and he has decided to leave. Alf finds Stu's body near the caravan park. Following a police investigation, Sasha confesses to killing Stu in self-defence. During an argument, Sasha pushed him away and he hit his head on a rock. It is revealed that Dennis Harling (Daniel Roberts) moved Stu's body from the scene and dumped him at the park. Sasha is subsequently found not guilty.

Sasha Bezmel

Sasha Bezmel, played by Demi Harman, made her first on screen appearance on 31 August 2011. Isabelle Cornish initially auditioned for the role of Sasha, however Harman was eventually cast. The actress relocated from Brisbane to Sydney for the part, which she said was a dream come true. Sasha is Sid Walker's (Robert Mammone) fifteen-year-old, illegitimate daughter. When Sasha's mother is killed in a car accident, Sasha is forced to move to Summer Bay to be with her father and half-siblings. Of her character Harman said "I just fell in love with her. Sasha is sassy, angry, stubborn and has a rebellious streak." A writer for the official show website explained "Though she's happy to meet with other half-siblings, in Dex and Indi, she is uncontrollable, naughty and independent." The writer added that Sasha is at an age where girls want to go "wild and ruin their future." For her portrayal of Sasha, Harman was nominated in the category of "Most Popular New Female Talent" at the 2012 Logie Awards.

Mark Gilmour

Mark Gilmour, played by Shane Emmett, made his first on screen appearance on 22 September 2011. Emmett had an extended guest turn on the show. The actor is the brother of late Home and Away actress Belinda Emmett (who played Rebecca Fisher) and he told The Daily Telegraph, "Of all the gigs, I knew it would be difficult because Belinda spent so much of her professional time there. And there are a lot of the characters Belinda used to work with still there, so I found myself surrounded by her." Mark is the wealthy boyfriend of Gypsy Nash (Kimberley Cooper). He and Gypsy's daughter, Lily Smith (Charlie Rose Maclennan), do not get on well as she is not ready for a new man in her and her mother's life.

Mark comes to visit Gypsy in Summer Bay and he clashes with her daughter Lily. Mark suggests sending Lily to boarding school, but Gypsy disagrees with the idea. Gypsy cooks dinner for Mark, but their evening is ruined when Lily reveals that Gypsy had a one-night stand with Liam Murphy (Axle Whitehead). Angered, Mark confronts Liam at Angelo's. Gypsy then breaks up with Mark.

Hayley O'Connor

Hayley O'Connor, played by Alyssa McClelland, made her first on screen appearance on 10 October 2011. McClelland previously appeared in Home and Away as Brooke MacPherson. 

Hayley is Casey Braxton's (Lincoln Younes) lawyer and she comforts his older brother, Darryl "Brax" (Steve Peacocke), when he is sent to jail. Of Hayley and Darryl, Peacocke said "Hayley is quite cunning, because she knows he's in a bad place. She sees the opportunity to go in when he's at his low point." Darryl's on-off girlfriend, Charlie Buckton (Esther Anderson), later sees the pair kissing and believes Darryl has moved on. Peacocke also confirmed there would be an "air of intrigue surrounding Hayley and her intentions", adding there will be a mystery as to why Hayley is in Summer Bay. Charlie becomes jealous when she sees Darryl giving Hayley a surfing lesson. The official Home and Away website said McClelland had to brave the elements "in a bikini on a freezing cold windy day at Palm Beach." McClelland returned to Home and Away as Hayley on 30 April 2012.

Hayley defends Casey Braxton in court, following his charge of arson. Hayley outs Charlie Buckton's relationship with Casey's brother, Brax. Despite her efforts, Casey is found guilty and sent to Juvenile Detention. The next day, Charlie runs into Hayley, who gives her the impression she is dating Brax. Later that evening, Hayley kisses Brax before they go out to dinner. Brax gives Hayley a surfing lesson on the beach. Charlie calls round to Brax's house and she finds Hayley there. Hayley then spends the night with Brax. When Brax is taken in for questioning about a robbery, he uses Hayley as his alibi. However, Hayley denies being with Brax and she tells him about her false statement just before she leaves town. Hayley returns to Summer Bay after Heath Braxton (Dan Ewing) hires her to help him stop Bianca Scott (Lisa Gormley) leaving town with his child. Hayley runs into Brax and he takes her to the edge of a cliff, where he confronts her about Charlie's death. Hayley confesses that she set him up and helped get Jake Pirovic (Fletcher Humphrys) released from prison because she had a drug problem. Brax tells her that he holds her responsible for Charlie's death and eventually lets her go.

Others

References

External links
Characters and cast at the Official AU Home and Away website
Characters and cast at the Official UK Home and Away website
Characters and cast at the Internet Movie Database

, 2011
, Home and Away